José Marín Sospedra (Catalan: Josep Marín i Sospedra; born 21 January 1950) is a retired Spanish racewalker.

Achievements

External links

Josep Marín in the Catalonia's Championship

1950 births
Living people
Spanish male racewalkers
Athletes from Catalonia
Athletes (track and field) at the 1980 Summer Olympics
Athletes (track and field) at the 1984 Summer Olympics
Athletes (track and field) at the 1988 Summer Olympics
Athletes (track and field) at the 1992 Summer Olympics
Olympic athletes of Spain
World record setters in athletics (track and field)
World Athletics Championships medalists
European Athletics Championships medalists
Spanish masters athletes
Mediterranean Games bronze medalists for Spain
Mediterranean Games medalists in athletics
Athletes (track and field) at the 1975 Mediterranean Games
World Athletics Race Walking Team Championships winners